Mohamed Samy (born 17 March 1997) is an Egyptian swimmer. He competed in the men's 100 metre freestyle event at the 2017 World Aquatics Championships. In 2019, he represented Egypt at the 2019 African Games held in Rabat, Morocco.

References

External links
 
 Indiana Hoosiers bio

1997 births
Living people
Egyptian male freestyle swimmers
Place of birth missing (living people)
African Games gold medalists for Egypt
African Games medalists in swimming
Indiana Hoosiers men's swimmers
Egyptian expatriate sportspeople in the United States
Swimmers at the 2015 African Games
Swimmers at the 2019 African Games
Sportspeople from Cairo
20th-century Egyptian people
21st-century Egyptian people